Nina Vajić (born 22 February 1948) is a Croatian lawyer and a former Judge of the European Court of Human Rights in respect of Croatia.

Early life
Vajić was born on 22 February 1948 in Zagreb, the capital and largest city of Croatia. She studied at the Faculty of Law of the University of Zagreb from 1966 to 1971, and then worked there as an Instructor until 1978, when she was promoted to Assistant and began a Master's in International Law at the Graduate Institute of International Studies (HEI) of the University of Geneva.

Legal career
She was appointed Assistant Professor at Zagreb in 1985 and Associate Professor in 1991, at which time she also became Director of the University's Institute of Public and Private International Law. In 1996 became Professor of Public International Law, but only held this post until 1998, when she was elected the first judge in respect of Croatia at the newly established permanent European Court of Human Rights. In 2013 she was succeeded by Ksenija Turković.

See also
European Court of Human Rights
List of judges of the European Court of Human Rights

References

External links
Website of the European Court of Human Rights
Nacional interview 

1948 births
Graduate Institute of International and Development Studies alumni
Judges of the European Court of Human Rights
Members of the European Commission against Racism and Intolerance
Croatian judges
Living people
Lawyers from Zagreb
University of Zagreb alumni
University of Geneva alumni
Croatian judges of international courts and tribunals
Croatian expatriates in Switzerland
Croatian expatriates in France